Elizabeth Davis Pittman (June 3, 1921 – April 8, 1998) was both the first woman judge and the first black judge in Nebraska. Born in Iowa, she moved in her youth to Omaha, Nebraska, where she would later earn a law degree. By the time she graduated, she was the first black woman lawyer in the state, and one of only a few in the western United States. The first woman deputy county attorney and the first black deputy county attorney, she would later be nominated for a municipal judgeship in Omaha. She retired in 1986 at age 65.

Early life 
Elizabeth Pittman was born on June 3, 1921, in Council Bluffs, Iowa, moving with her family soon to Omaha, Nebraska. Her mother was a librarian, and her father a lawyer and leader in the local black community. She attended Omaha North High School, a school outside of the local black community, graduating in 1938; she later attended the University of Nebraska and Creighton University, the latter of which awarded her a law degree in 1948. In the 1950 census—the first after she had graduated—she was the sole black woman lawyer in the state, and one of only 13 west of Illinois. At age 28, she swore into the United States District Court for the District of Nebraska with her father attending.

Career 
She soon entered private practice with the help of her father, and by 1964, was only one of two women lawyers operating private practice in the city. That year, she was named a deputy county attorney, the first woman and the first black deputy county attorney for Douglas County. She would serve this role until 1971.

On April 9, 1971, after being nominated by governor J. James Exon, she was sworn in as a municipal court judge in Omaha, becoming at the time the first black person to serve as a judge in the city. Exon had nominated her from a list created by a nominating commission, and as she was not likely to have been popularly elected to the post, a Nebraska newspaper said the commission was "due commendation". Two years into her tenure, she had become one of only 39 black women judges in the country.

Retirement and death 
On July 21, 1986, just a month after her 65th birthday, she sent a letter to governor Bob Kerrey announcing her intention to retire on October 1 of that year. The mandatory retirement age for judges in Nebraska was 72 years old, and she was due for a referendum on whether to retain her as a judge that November; nearly 60 percent of polled attorneys believed she should not be retained. With her retirement going into effect, Donna Polk (a director for a multicultural organization in Lincoln) said there was "an ethnic vacuum" left over, with few role models left for young black women.

She died on April 8, 1998.

References

Citations

Bibliography 

 
 
 
 

 
 
 
 
 

1921 births
1998 deaths
African-American judges
African-American women lawyers
African-American lawyers
American women judges